Wamanripa (local name for Senecio or a species of it, also applied for Laccopetalum giganteum, Hispanicized spelling Huamanripa) is a mountainous complex in the Wansu mountain range in the Andes of Peru, about  high. It is situated in the Cusco Region, Chumbivilcas Province, Santo Tomás District. Wamanripa lies southeast of the mountain Chankuwaña and east of the mountains Waytani and Uturunku.

The highest peak of Wamanripa lies in the northeast of the massif at the Wamanripa valley. The river Qañawimayu flows along its southern slope.

References 

Mountains of Peru
Mountains of Cusco Region